Alex Hammond (born 25 December 1975 in Johannesburg, South Africa) is an Australian crime fiction writer. He is also published under the name A. W. Hammond.

Life
In 1981 he emigrated to Australia with his family. He graduated in Law/Arts from Melbourne University in 2001 and worked for several law firms before becoming an editor and web manager for the University of Melbourne and later RMIT University.

Author
In 1997, 1998, and 1999 he wrote several short stories for Inferno! Tales of Fantasy & Adventure, a publication of Black Library and Games Workshop. The short stories were, The Demon Bottle for issue 1, The Emperor's Grace for issue 3, A World Above for issue 6, Ancient Lances for issue 11, and Rat in the Walls for issue 14.

His first novel, Blood Witness (Penguin 2013), is a contemporary crime thriller set in Melbourne featuring defence lawyer Will Harris. It was short-listed for a Ned Kelly Award for Australian Crime Writing in 2014. It and its sequel, The Unbroken Line (Penguin 2015) were optioned for a TV Series.

Of his third novel, The Paris Collaborator (Echo 2021), The Sydney Morning Herald said he "artfully constructs this historical thriller within a paranoid and desperate city, creating plenty of twist and tension." The novel is set in German-occupied Paris and follows former schoolteacher Auguste Duchene as he searches for missing people in the days before the battle for the city's liberation.

Bibliography

Will Harris novels
Blood Witness (2013)
The Unbroken Line (2015)

The Paris Collaborator (2021)

Interviews
Better Reading Podcast A.W. Hammond on the Moral Grey Areas of WWII, July 2021
Final Draft - Great Conversations A.W. Hammond's The Paris Collaborator (Part One), June 2021
The Sydney Morning Herald Alex Hammond's The Unbroken Line a legal thriller set in Melbourne, July 2015
The West Australian Thriller genre the perfect choice, July 2013
ABC Brisbane Drive with Mary-Lou Stephens, August 2013

External links
Official Website
The Paris Collaborator - Echo Publishing
Author page - Penguin Australia

References

Living people
1975 births
21st-century Australian novelists
Australian male novelists
Australian crime writers
21st-century Australian male writers